Iliaş Alexandru (also called Iliaş III), (c. 1635 – 1675) was voivode or Ruler of Moldova from 1666 to 1668. He was the son of a previous ruler. The person who preceded and reigned after him was Gheorghe Duca.

In 1668 he punished Nicolae Milescu who had been plotting against him by having his nose cut off. Milescu had to leave and went to Constantinople.

In 1999 he was seen on a Moldovan stamp.

References

Rulers of Moldavia
17th-century monarchs in Europe
Year of birth unknown
Year of death unknown
House of Bogdan-Mușat